Tiraque is a province in the Cochabamba Department in central Bolivia. Its capital is Tiraque.

Subdivision 
The province is divided into two municipalities which are further subdivided into cantons.

Shinahota Municipality (formerly Shinahota Canton or Central Busch Canton being a part of Tiraque Province) was created on July 4, 2009.

Languages 
The languages spoken in the Tiraque Province are mainly Quechua and Spanish.

Places of interest 
 Carrasco National Park

See also 
 Jatun Mayu
 Pila Qucha
 Sayt'u Qucha
 T'utura Qucha

References

External links
 Map of the Tiraque Province

Provinces of Cochabamba Department